Shotgun Jimmie is the stage name of Jim Kilpatrick, a Canadian singer-songwriter. Formerly associated with the band Shotgun & Jaybird, since that band's breakup he has released several albums as a solo artist.

His 2011 album Transistor Sister was named as a longlisted nominee for the 2011 Polaris Music Prize.

On March 24, 2017, a 30-track tribute album to Kilpatrick and his songwriting was released via bandcamp.com, by a fan-driven label  known as “Comin’ Around Records". Artists featured on the album included Kilpatrick's former Shotgun & Jaybird bandmate Frederick Squire, as well as Michael Feuerstack, Spencer Burton, Huron, By Divine Right, Eamon McGrath, Jenny Omnichord, Woodpigeon, Old Man Luedecke and Selina Martin.

Discography
The 6000 True Stories of Love (2004)
The Onlys (2007)
Still Jimmie (2009)
Paint it Pink (2009, EP)
Organ Donor (2009) (Limited to one copy, auctioned off with an Organ)
Transistor Sister (2011)
Everything Everything (2013)
Field of Trampolines (2016)
Transistor Sister 2 (2019)

References

External links
 

Year of birth missing (living people)
Place of birth missing (living people)
Living people
Canadian singer-songwriters
Canadian indie rock musicians
21st-century Canadian male singers
Canadian male singer-songwriters